Harlow Town railway station is on the West Anglia Main Line serving the town of Harlow in Essex, England. Its three-letter station code is HWN.

The station and all trains serving it are operated by Greater Anglia.

History
The station was opened in 1842 as Burnt Mill, to serve the small village of the same name.

Between March 1959 and July 1960 the station was rebuilt to serve the post-war new town of Harlow, to designs by Paul Hamilton with John Bicknell and Ian Fraser of the British Railways (Eastern Region) architects department (chief architect: H. H. Powell). Described by Pevsner as "low, crisp and entirely ungimmicky", its architectural quality was recognised in 1996 when it was made a Grade II listed building. The listing entry states "the Eastern Region Architect's Department was the most creative branch of British Railways, designing a number of powerful modern stations in conjunction with the Region's electrification. The new station for Harlow New Town was the flagship of this achievement. It is a building with powerful spatial qualities, of especial interest particularly for its architectural design".

The Architect and Building News in 1959 said the architects have aimed at expressing the beauty of continuous surfaces of natural materials and paintwork has been reduced to a minimum.

On 13 July 1960, the station was renamed Harlow Town. Its status as a listed building has meant that alterations to conform with the Disability Discrimination Act have had to be carried out sensitively to protect the original architectural conception.

Services

All services at Harlow Town are operated by Greater Anglia (including some services which operate under the Stansted Express brand). Services are operated using  and  EMUs.

The typical off-peak service in trains per hour is:
 4 tph to London Liverpool Street (2 of these are Stansted Express services, 1 is semi-fast and 1 is a stopping service)
 2 tph to 
 2 tph to 

On Sundays, the services between Stratford and Bishop's Stortford do not run.

The station today
The station has four platforms. Platform 2 is for services towards London Liverpool Street and Stratford. Platform 3 is for services towards Stansted Airport and Cambridge. Platforms 1 and 4 are used less frequently for slow trains and as a Waiting loop for freight trains from the aggregate terminal a mile down the line, they are however used by a number of peak starting/terminating services to/from Liverpool Street or Stratford and by a few through trains northbound and southbound. Currently all platforms accommodate 12 car trains.

In December 2009 ticket barriers were installed at the station, to help reduce penalty fare evasion from the station. The platforms can accommodate 12 car trains.

References

External links

 

Grade II listed buildings in Essex
Railway stations in Essex
DfT Category C1 stations
Modernist architecture in England
Transport in Harlow
Grade II listed railway stations
Former Great Eastern Railway stations
Railway stations in Great Britain opened in 1842
Greater Anglia franchise railway stations